Qugboxung is a village and township of the Samzhubzê District (Shigatse City), in the Tibet Autonomous Region of China.

References 

Township-level divisions of Tibet
Samzhubzê District